Shirts & Skins an American 6 episode television reality series premiered September 15, 2008 on Logo. The show explores the lives of the San Francisco The Rockdogs, "an all-gay basketball team trying to uphold its three-generation legacy of international Gay Games gold medals, and U.S. national tournament wins".

After their 2006 Gay Games victory, the Rockdogs split up due to weakened team morale and interpersonal conflict amongst the team members. In the series, many team members return to San Francisco and stay in a refurbished firehouse where the teammates live and practice for the Chicago National Championship. The show focuses on six players of the team and lives on and off the court: Mike Survillion, Rory Ray, Peter Hannibal, Chris Johnson, Jamel Lewis and DeMarco Majors. With only a month to train before the national championship, all of the men will have to put aside their differences and learn to become a team again. Guest appearances in the show include professional basketball athletes John Amaechi and Sheryl Swoopes. Sports Illustrated described the series as "The Rockdogs have talent, and the show's basketball action is strong. On and off the court someone like [Shavlik] Randolph could learn a few things from Shirts".

Overview
Set in San Francisco, the show features the lives of players Chris, DeMarco Majors, Jamel, Mikey, Peter, and Rory, as they share a house in San Francisco's Mission district and prepare, physically and financially, for the 2008 national basketball tournament held in Chicago. Shirts & Skins premiered September 15, 2008 on the Logo television network.

The show spanned six episodes and featured guest appearances from gay professional athletes such as former-NBA player John Amaechi as the team's "mentor" and "psychologist", and WNBA Superstar Sheryl Swoopes.

Episodes

Notable guest stars
John Amaechi
Sheryl Swoopes

Awards 
Shirts & Skins was nominated for a 2008 GLAAD Media Award in the Outstanding Reality Program category, along with other reality shows America's Next Top Model (The CW), I Want to Work for Diddy (VH1), Kathy Griffin: My Life on the D-List (Bravo), and Transamerican Love Story (Logo).

External links
Shirts & Skins on LOGO

Official Website of the San Francisco Rockdogs
Official Facebook Shirts & Skins Fan Page

References

2008 American television series debuts
2008 American television series endings
2000s American reality television series
Logo TV original programming
Basketball television series
2000s LGBT-related reality television series
2000s American LGBT-related television series